Alejandro Menéndez García (born 12 July 1966) is a Spanish football manager.

Career
Born in Gijón, Asturias, Menéndez started his managerial career at Sporting de Gijón's youth setup. After winning the 2004 Copa de Campeones Juvenil de Fútbol and being a runner-up in 2005 Copa del Rey Juvenil, he moved to Real Madrid as a manager of the Juvenil squad.

In July 2007, Menéndez was named Celta de Vigo B manager, with the side in Segunda División B. On 13 May 2008 he was appointed at the helm of the main squad, replacing fired Antonio Lopez, and subsequently avoided relegation with the club.

Menéndez subsequently returned to Celta's B-team and, in 2009, was appointed at another reserve team, Real Madrid Castilla also in the third tier. On 4 January 2011, he was relieved from his duties.

On 5 March 2013, Menéndez was appointed manager of Racing de Santander as a replacement to dismissed José Aurelio Gay. However, he could not avoid the club's relegation to the third level, and subsequently left the club.

In September 2013 Menéndez moved abroad for the first time in his career, being named Buriram United F.C. manager in Thailand. With the side he achieved immediate success, winning a domestic treble (Thai Premier League, Thai FA Cup and Thai League Cup) during his first season in charge.

Menéndez resigned on 11 April 2014, after winning the Toyota Premier Cup and the Kor Royal Cup. On 28 December of that year, he was named as the new manager of China League One side Shaanxi Wuzhou, but left the side one month later due to its bureaucratic problems.

One year since his last job, Menéndez returned to Celta B in February 2016 where he signed a one and a-half-year contract as a replacement for the sacked Javier Torres Gomez.

In August 2018, Menendez joined East Bengal F.C. of India's I-League for the upcoming season, as part of a spending spree by new owners Quess Corp. He led the club to second place, one point behind Chennai City FC, and won both Kolkata Derby matches against Mohun Bagan A.C. ;  at the end of the campaign in March 2019 he extended his link by two years. He resigned on 21 January 2020, after taking just eight points from the first seven games of the season.

Menéndez returned to his home country on 8 December 2020, after being appointed Albacete Balompié's third manager of the season.

Managerial statistics

Honours

Buriram United
Thai Premier League: 2013
Thai FA Cup: 2013
Thai League Cup: 2013
Kor Royal Cup: 2014
Toyota Premier Cup: 2014

Individual awards 

 I-League Coach of the Month (December 2019)

References

External links

1966 births
Living people
Sportspeople from Gijón
Spanish football managers
Segunda División managers
Segunda División B managers
RC Celta de Vigo managers
Real Madrid Castilla managers
Racing de Santander managers
Burgos CF managers
Albacete Balompié managers
Alejandro Menendez
I-League managers
East Bengal Club managers
Spanish expatriate football managers
Spanish expatriate sportspeople in Thailand
Spanish expatriate sportspeople in China
Spanish expatriate sportspeople in India
Expatriate football managers in Thailand
Expatriate football managers in China
Expatriate football managers in India
Celta de Vigo B managers